Brebu is a commune in Caraș-Severin County, western Romania with a population of 1,340 people. It is composed of three villages: Apadia (Apádia), Brebu and Valeadeni (Váldény).

References

Communes in Caraș-Severin County
Localities in Romanian Banat